Hanan Daoud Mikhael Ashrawi (born 8 October 1946) is a Palestinian politician, legislator, activist, and scholar who served as a member of the Leadership Committee and as an official spokesperson of the Palestinian delegation to the Middle East peace process, beginning with the Madrid Peace Conference of 1991. In 1996, Ashrawi was appointed as the Palestinian Authority Minister of Higher Education and Research. Prior to that, she was dean of the Faculty of Arts at Birzeit University and head of its Legal Aid Committee since the mid-1970s.

Ashrawi was elected to the Palestinian Legislative Council representing Jerusalem in 1996, and she was re-elected for the “Third Way” bloc ticket in 2006.  Making history as the first woman to hold a seat in the highest executive body in Palestine, she was elected as member of the Executive Committee of the Palestine Liberation Organization (PLO) in 2009 and in 2018. She resigned from the post in December 2020 citing the need for the renewal of the PLO. 

As a civil society activist, she founded the Independent Commission for Human Rights in 1994 and served as its Commissioner-General until 1995.  In 1998, she also founded MIFTAH, the Palestinian Initiative for the Promotion of Global Dialogue and Democracy and continues to serve as head of its board of directors.  In 1999, Ashrawi founded the National Coalition for Accountability and Integrity (AMAN).

Ashrawi serves on the advisory and international boards of several global, regional and local organizations dealing with a variety of issues including human rights, women’s rights, policy formation, peacemaking, and nation-building.

Ashrawi is the recipient of numerous awards from all over the world, including the distinguished French decoration, “d'Officier de l'Ordre National de la Légion d'Honneur” in 2006; the 2005 Mahatma Gandhi International Award for Peace and Reconciliation; the 2003 Sydney Peace Prize; the 2002 Olof Palme Prize; the 1999 International Women of Hope “Bread and Roses”; the Defender of Democracy Award – Parliamentarians for Global Action; the 50 Women of the Century; the 1996 Jane Addams International Women’s Leadership Award; the Pearl S. Buck Foundation Women’s Award; the 1994 Pio Manzu Gold Medal Peace Award; and the 1992 Marissa Bellisario International Peace Award.

She is the author of several books, articles, poems and short stories on Palestinian politics, culture and literature. Her book This Side of Peace (Simon & Schuster, 1995) earned worldwide recognition. Ashrawi received both Bachelor of Arts and Master of Arts degrees from the American University of Beirut and a Doctor of Philosophy degree in Medieval and Comparative Literature from the University of Virginia in the United States.  Moreover, she is the recipient of eleven honorary doctorates from universities in the U.S., Canada, Europe, and the Arab world.

She is married to Emile Ashrawi and has two daughters, Amal and Zeina.

Early life
Ashrawi was born to Palestinian Christian parents on 8 October 1946 in the city of Nablus, British Mandate for Palestine, now part of the occupied West Bank. Her father, Daoud Mikhail, was a physician and one of the founders of the Palestine Liberation Organization, and her mother Wadi’a Ass’ad Mikhail, was an ophthalmic nurse.

1948 war and education
The Ashrawi family lived in Nablus. Then from Nablus, her family moved to the warm city of Tiberias in the north where they remained until Israel became a state in 1948. In 1948, the Mikhail family fled from Tiberias to Amman, Jordan as a result of the 1948 Arab–Israeli War. Initially, her father, Daoud Mikhail, remained behind in what became Israel, but later rejoined the family in Jordan.

In 1950 her family were able to settle in Ramallah, at the time part of the Jordanian annexed West Bank. Here, she attended the Ramallah Friends Girls School, a Quaker school for girls. She was inspired to activism by her father, who favored a greater role for women in society and was repeatedly imprisoned by the Jordanian authorities for his activities with the Arab Nationalist Socialist Party and the PLO. She received her bachelor's and master's degrees in literature in the Department of English at the American University of Beirut (AUB).

While a graduate student in literature at the American University in Beirut she dated Peter Jennings of ABC News who was then stationed there as ABC's Beirut bureau chief. When the Six-Day War broke out in 1967, Dr. Ashrawi, then a 22-year-old student in Lebanon, was declared an absentee by Israel and denied re-entry to the West Bank. For the next six years, Ashrawi traveled and completed her education gaining a Ph.D. in Medieval and Comparative Literature from the University of Virginia. Ashrawi was finally allowed to re-join her family in 1973 under the family reunification plan.

Personal life
On 8 August 1975, she married Emile Ashrawi, a Christian Jerusalemite who is now a photographer and a theater director. Together, they have two daughters, Amal and Zeina.

Ashrawi is the recipient of eleven honorary doctorates from universities in the U.S., Canada, Europe, and the Arab world. These include: The American University of Beirut (AUB) – Lebanon (June 2008); The American University in Cairo (AUC), Doctor of Humane Letters – Cairo, Egypt (June 2003); Saint Mary’s University, Doctor of Civil Law – Halifax, Canada (October 2000); Smith College, Doctor of Humane Letters – Northampton, Massachusetts (1999); Earlham College, Doctor of Humane Letters – Richmond, Indiana (1999); Vrije Universiteit Brussel – Belgium (1997); Bath University, Doctor of Laws – Bath, England (1993); and The Virginia Theological Seminary – Alexandria, Virginia (1993).

She is a member of various international advisory boards and councils. Her past and present memberships include the following: U.S./Middle East Project; TAKREEM Arab Achievement Awards; Center for Transregional Studies "Advisory Council" – Princeton University; Council on Foreign Relations – Washington D.C.; Deir Yassin Remembered – New York; Fund for the Future of Our Children – Washington D.C.; Initiative for Peace and Cooperation in the Middle East – Special project of The Search for Common Ground; International Commission on Intervention and State Sovereignty; International Institute for Democracy and Electoral Assistance (IDEA)- Stockholm, Sweden; Member of the UN Secretary General’s Group for Dialogue Among Civilizations; Mercy Corps International – WashingtonPeace Works – U.S.; Task Force on Higher Education (A World Bank, Harvard University and UNESCO initiative); The Carter Center (Human Rights Center); The Dialogue Center – The Netherlands; The World Bank Middle East and North Africa Region (MENA); United Nations Research Institute for Social Development (UNRISD); Palestine Institute for Public Diplomacy (PIPD); The Holy Land Christian Ecumenical Foundation – Know Thy Heritage Advisory Board; CAABU – Honorary Patron; Beyond Conflict (formerly The Project on Justice in Times of Transition) – New York, U.S.; and the UN Women Executive Directors Civil Society Advisory Group.

On 26 September 2009, in an interview on Riz Khan's One on One on Al Jazeera English, Ashrawi defined her current role in the following way: "I think of myself essentially as a human being with a multidimensional mission. Basically, I am a Palestinian, I am a woman, I am an activist and a humanist, more than being a politician. And at the same time I feel that quite often things are thrust upon us rather than come as a result of a calm and deliberate choice."

On 12 October 2020, Ashrawi tested positive for COVID-19.

Politics and activism

While voluntarily a student but denied re-entry to the West Bank, she became the spokesperson for the General Union of Palestinian Students in Lebanon, helped organize women’s revolutionary groups and served as a guide to foreign reporters visiting Palestinian refugee camps.

Ashrawi returned to the West Bank under the family reunification plan in 1973 and established the Department of English at Birzeit University. She served as Chair of that department from 1973 to 1978, and again from 1981 through 1984; and from 1986–1990 she served the university as Dean of the Faculty of Arts. She remained a faculty member at Birzeit University until 1995, publishing numerous poems, short stories, papers and articles on Palestinian culture, literature, and politics.

Ashrawi's political activism in the Palestinian territories began almost as early as her academic career at Birzeit. In 1974, she founded the Birzeit University Legal Aid Committee and Human Rights Action Project. Her political work took a greater leap in 1988 during the First Intifada, when she joined the Intifada Political Committee, serving on its Diplomatic Committee until 1993. From 1991 to 1993 she served as the official spokesperson of the Palestinian Delegation to the Middle East peace process and a member of the Leadership/Guidance Committee and executive committee of the delegation.

From 1993 to 1995, with the signing of the Oslo Accords by Yasser Arafat and Yitzhak Rabin, Palestinian self-rule was established, and Ashrawi headed the Preparatory Committee of the Palestinian Independent Commission for Citizens' Rights in Jerusalem. Ashrawi has also served since 1996 as an elected member of the Palestinian Legislative Council, Jerusalem Governorate.

In 1996, Ashrawi was appointed the Palestinian Authority Minister of Higher Education and Research, but she resigned the post in 1998 in protest against political corruption, specifically Arafat's handling of peace talks and later that year founded MIFTAH—the Palestinian Initiative for the Promotion of Global Dialogue and Democracy, an initiative which works towards respect for Palestinian human rights, democracy and peace.

In July 2011, she represented the Palestinian people in a meeting with the Canadian Foreign Minister John Baird and convinced him to visit the Palestinian territories.

Speaking to the United Nations in 2018, Ashrawi said that the actions of the Trump Administration, including the United States recognition of Jerusalem as capital of Israel, its movement of its embassy and its promised "Deal of the century" had made the two state solution "very much in doubt", adding "Unless there is the will to engage, to intervene effectively – not just to end settlement activities but to begin to dismantle settlements – Israel will have succeeded in super-imposing Greater Israel on all of historical Palestine".

In August 2020, Ashrawi lambasted the peace agreement between Israel and the United Arab Emirates, writing on Twitter that "Israel got rewarded for not declaring openly what it's been doing to Palestine illegally and persistently since the beginning of the occupation."

Sydney Peace prize
In 2003 Ashrawi was awarded the Sydney Peace Prize. Her selection drew praise from Mary Robinson (former United Nations High Commissioner for Human Rights, and former President of Ireland), and Archbishop Desmond Tutu. Madeleine Albright, former US Secretary of State also supported the selection and said, "She [Ashrawi] is a brilliant spokeswoman for her cause."

Her selection was controversial among some Jewish political organisations. Michael Kapel, a member of the board of the Australia/Israel & Jewish Affairs Council called her "an apologist for Islamic terror". Activist Antony Loewenstein argued in his book My Israel Question that the Australian media, and various Jewish organizations, defamed and vilified Ashrawi in order to prevent her winning the Peace Prize. Of the controversy, Israeli politician Yael Dayan said, "And this Hanan Ashrawi... I think she's very courageous, and she contributes quite a lot to the peace process." Baruch Kimmerling, a sociologist from the Hebrew University, wrote, "As an Israeli, as a Jew and as an academic I am deeply sorry and ashamed that members of the Australian Jewish community are acting against this rightful nomination."

Works published
 
 Anthology of Palestinian Literature (ed).
 The Modern Palestinian Short Story: An Introduction to Practical Criticism
 Contemporary Palestinian Literature under Occupation
 Contemporary Palestinian Poetry and Fiction
 Literary Translation: Theory and Practice
 This Side of Peace: A Personal Account 

Notes

External links

 Lecture transcript and video of Ashrawi's speech at the Joan B. Kroc Institute for Peace & Justice at the University of San Diego, November 2004

1946 births
Living people
Palestinian democracy activists
Anglican writers
Palestinian women in politics
Olof Palme Prize laureates
University of Virginia alumni
American University of Beirut alumni
Palestinian Anglicans
Palestine Liberation Organization members
Palestinian human rights activists
People from Nablus
Palestinian women academics
Palestinian literary critics
Palestinian memoirists
Third Way (Palestinian Authority) politicians
Government ministers of the Palestinian National Authority
Academic staff of Birzeit University
Women government ministers of the Palestinian National Authority
Members of the 2006 Palestinian Legislative Council
Members of the 1996 Palestinian Legislative Council
Members of the Executive Committee of the Palestine Liberation Organization
20th-century Palestinian politicians
21st-century Palestinian politicians
20th-century Palestinian women politicians
21st-century Palestinian women politicians